This is a list of cases reported in volume 294 of United States Reports, decided by the Supreme Court of the United States in 1935.

Justices of the Supreme Court at the time of volume 294 U.S. 

The Supreme Court is established by Article III, Section 1 of the Constitution of the United States, which says: "The judicial Power of the United States, shall be vested in one supreme Court . . .". The size of the Court is not specified; the Constitution leaves it to Congress to set the number of justices. Under the Judiciary Act of 1789 Congress originally fixed the number of justices at six (one chief justice and five associate justices). Since 1789 Congress has varied the size of the Court from six to seven, nine, ten, and back to nine justices (always including one chief justice).

When the cases in volume 294 were decided the Court comprised the following nine members:

Notable Cases in 294 U.S.

Jurney v. MacCracken
In Jurney v. MacCracken,  294 U.S. 125 (1935), the Supreme Court held that Congress has an implicit power to find a person in contempt of Congress.

Gold Clause cases
The Gold Clause Cases (Norman v. Baltimore and Ohio Railroad Company, with United States v. Bankers' Trust Company,  294 U.S. 240 (1935); Nortz v. United States  294 U.S. 317 (1935); and Perry v. United States,   294 U.S. 330 (1935)) were a series of matters in which the Supreme Court narrowly upheld restrictions on the ownership of gold implemented by the administration of U.S. President Franklin D. Roosevelt in response to the Great Depression.

Baldwin v. G.A.F. Seelig, Inc.
In Baldwin v. G.A.F. Seelig, Inc.,  294 U.S. 511 (1935), the Supreme Court held that a state may not regulate intrastate prices by prohibiting the importation of less expensive goods in interstate commerce. It established the principle that one state, in its dealings with another, cannot place itself in economic isolation.

Scottsboro Boys cases
The notorious Scottsboro Boys cases (Norris v. Alabama,  294 U.S. 587 (1935); and Patterson v. Alabama,  294 U.S. 600 (1935)) arose from  
charges against nine African American teenagers and young men, ages 13 to 20, accused in Alabama of raping two white women in 1931.  The landmark set of legal cases from this incident dealt with racism and the right to a fair trial. The cases included a lynch mob before the suspects had been indicted, all-white juries, rushed trials, death sentences, and disruptive mobs. It is commonly cited as an example of a legal injustice in the United States legal system. On appeal the Supreme Court ruled that African Americans had to be included on juries, and ordered retrials of the young men.

Federal court system 

Under the Judiciary Act of 1789 the federal court structure at the time comprised District Courts, which had general trial jurisdiction; Circuit Courts, which had mixed trial and appellate (from the US District Courts) jurisdiction; and the United States Supreme Court, which had appellate jurisdiction over the federal District and Circuit courts—and for certain issues over state courts. The Supreme Court also had limited original jurisdiction (i.e., in which cases could be filed directly with the Supreme Court without first having been heard by a lower federal or state court). There were one or more federal District Courts and/or Circuit Courts in each state, territory, or other geographical region.

The Judiciary Act of 1891 created the United States Courts of Appeals and reassigned the jurisdiction of most routine appeals from the district and circuit courts to these appellate courts. The Act created nine new courts that were originally known as the "United States Circuit Courts of Appeals." The new courts had jurisdiction over most appeals of lower court decisions. The Supreme Court could review either legal issues that a court of appeals certified or decisions of court of appeals by writ of certiorari. On January 1, 1912, the effective date of the Judicial Code of 1911, the old Circuit Courts were abolished, with their remaining trial court jurisdiction transferred to the U.S. District Courts.

List of cases in volume 294 U.S. 

[a] McReynolds took no part in the case
[b] Brandeis took no part in the case

Notes and references

External links
  Case reports in volume 294 from Library of Congress
  Case reports in volume 294 from Court Listener
  Case reports in volume 294 from the Caselaw Access Project of Harvard Law School
  Case reports in volume 294 from Google Scholar
  Case reports in volume 294 from Justia
  Case reports in volume 294 from Open Jurist
 Website of the United States Supreme Court
 United States Courts website about the Supreme Court
 National Archives, Records of the Supreme Court of the United States
 American Bar Association, How Does the Supreme Court Work?
 The Supreme Court Historical Society